Nikolai Charles (born 1 October 1986) is a Barbadian cricketer. He played in sixteen first-class and four List A matches for the Barbados cricket team from 2008 to 2016.

See also
 List of Barbadian representative cricketers

References

External links
 

1986 births
Living people
Barbadian cricketers
Barbados cricketers